Brithdir is a small village in the northern part of the Rhymney Valley near New Tredegar, in the county borough of Caerphilly, south Wales, and within the historic boundaries of Glamorgan.

It was formed in the early twentieth century to provide housing for men working at the local coal mines including Elliot's colliery.

Centuries before Brithdir was constructed a stone was erected on the mountain top above the village to mark the burial place of Tegernacus, son of Martius. The stone, believed to have been placed in the 7th century, was originally in a field north west of Capel Brithdir. However, in 1922 the Tegernacus Stone was moved to the National Museum Cardiff where it remains on display.

The village is served by Brithdir railway station.

Kieron Evans (born 2001), footballer for Cardiff City F.C., was born in Brithdir, but went to school in Bargoed.

External links
 Check out the history of the local coal mines at Welsh Coal Mines
www.geograph.co.uk : photos of Brithdir and surrounding area

Villages in Caerphilly County Borough